Eleutherochir is a monotypic genus of dragonets native to the Indian Ocean and the western Pacific Ocean. It contains a single species, Eleutherochir opercularis, the flap-gilled dragonet which is distributed from Sri Lanka and the east coast of India through the Malay Archipelago to the Ryukyu Islands. It can be found over shallow sandy and muddy substrates in the sea, but has been recorded entering the mouths of rivers and even to live in freshwater.

References

Callionymidae
Marine fish genera
Taxa named by Pieter Bleeker
Fish described in 1837
Monotypic fish genera